The Sydney Flames are an Australian professional basketball team based in Sydney, New South Wales. The Flames compete in the Women's National Basketball League (WNBL) and play their home games at Quaycentre.

Formerly known as the Sydney Uni Flames, the team rebranded in August 2022 to have a new look, new colours (changing from navy and gold to silver and black) and a new home venue.

The Flames have won four WNBL championships, in 1993, 1997, 2001 and 2017. They have also finished as runners-up a further 10 times.

Players

Current roster

Coaches and staff

Head coaches

Notes
 Across the years of 1981–1989, Robbie Cadee coached four seasons (1981–1982, 1987–1989) 
 Across the years of 1997–2000, Bill Tomlinson coached two seasons (1997 & 1999–00) 
Win/Loss statistics stand as of the end of the 2018–19 WNBL season

References

External links

 Official WNBL website
 Sydney Uni Flames official website

 
Sport at the University of Sydney
Women's National Basketball League teams
Sports teams in Sydney
Basketball teams in New South Wales
Basketball teams established in 1981
1980 establishments in Australia
University and college sports clubs in Australia